Robert Palmer may refer to:

Academics
 Robert Roswell Palmer (1909–2002), historian
 Robert E. A. Palmer or R. E. A. Palmer (1933–2006), classical scholar and ancient historian
 Robert Brian Palmer (born 1934), British-American nuclear physicist and researcher

Business
 Robert Palmer (computer businessman) (born 1940), CEO of Digital Equipment Corporation
 Robert W. Palmer, land appraiser for Madison Guaranty; pleaded guilty in Whitewater controversy
 Robert Palmer (vintner) (1934–2009), American advertising executive and vintner

Music
 Robert Palmer (singer) (1949–2003), English singer-songwriter and musician
 Robert Moffat Palmer (1915–2010), American composer

Politics and military
 Robert Palmer (MP) (1793–1872), English Conservative Member of Parliament
Robert Moffett Palmer (1820–1862), American diplomat and politician
 Robert Palmer, 1st Baron Rusholme (1890–1977), General Secretary of the British Co-operative Union and member of the House of Lords
 Robert Anthony Maurice Palmer (1920–1944), British bomber pilot and recipient of the Victoria Cross

Sports
 Robert Palmer (skier) (born 1947), New Zealand Olympic skier 
 Robert Palmer (cricketer) (born 1960), Hong Kong-born former English cricketer

Writers
 Robert Palmer, pseudonym of Cyriel Buysse (1859–1932), Flemish author
 Robert Palmer (writer) (1945–1997), American music critic and blues producer
 Robert Palmer (British writer) (1888–1916), British writer, poet and army officer

See also
Rob Palmer (disambiguation)